Pere Riba was the defending champion, however lost to Alessio di Mauro already in the first round.
Aljaž Bedene, who received wildcard into the singles main draw, won this tournament. He defeated 3rd seed Filippo Volandri in the final.

Seeds

Draw

Finals

Top half

Bottom half

References
 Main Draw
 Qualifying Draw

Open Barletta Trofeo Dimiccoli and Boraccino - Singles
2011 Singles